Fast Yellow AB is an azo dye. It used to be used as a food dye, designated in Europe by the E number E105.  It is now delisted in both Europe and USA and is forbidden if used in foods and drinks, as toxicological data has shown it is harmful. E105 has been implicated in non-atopic asthma.

References 

Food colorings
Azo dyes
Anilines
Benzenesulfonic acids
Acid dyes